Subhash Ghai  (born 24 January 1945) is an Indian film director, producer and screenwriter, known for his works predominantly in Hindi cinema. He was one of the most prominent and successful filmmakers of Hindi cinema throughout 80s and 90s. His most notable works include Kalicharan (1976), Vishwanath (1978), Karz (1980), Hero (1983), Vidhaata (1982), Meri Jung (1985), Karma (1986), Ram Lakhan (1989), Saudagar (1991), Khalnayak (1993), Pardes (1997) and Taal (1999).

In 1982, he started Mukta Arts Private Limited which, in 2000, became a public company, with Subhash Ghai as its executive chairman. In 2006, he received the National Film Award for Best Film on Other Social Issues for producing the social problem film Iqbal. The same year he founded the Whistling Woods International film and media institution in Mumbai. In 2015, he received the IIFA Award for Outstanding Contribution to Indian Cinema.

Early life
Born in Nagpur, India, Subhash Ghai's father was a dentist in Delhi. Ghai graduated in commerce from Rohtak, Haryana, and then went to pursue graduation in Cinema from the Film and Television Institute of India, Pune.

Career
In an interview with Rajya Sabha TV, Ghai recounted that after passing out from FTII, he came to Bombay, but was not allowed to enter any studio as he was unknown. He then read self help books like Dale Carnegie's How to Win friends and influence people, and used techniques given in it to help him try and enter the film industry. At the same time, he learnt of and entered a United Producers Filmfare talent contest. Of the 5,000 participants, three people were selected in it, he, Rajesh Khanna and Dheeraj Kumar. While Khanna received a role soon after, Ghai received a role a year later.

Ghai started his career in Hindi cinema as an actor with small roles in films including Taqdeer (1967) and Aradhana (1969). He was the male lead in the 1970s Umang and Gumraah. His directorial debut was the film Kalicharan (1976) which he obtained through a recommendation by Shatrughan Sinha. , he has written and directed a total of 16 movies.

In the 1980s and 1990s, he formed a successful collaboration with Dilip Kumar whom he directed in Vidhaata (1982), Karma (1986) and Saudagar (1991), the latter for which he won the Filmfare Award for Best Director. He introduced Jackie Shroff as a leading actor in Hero (1983) and helped establish Anil Kapoor's rising career with Meri Jung (1985). He went on to frequently work with Shroff and Kapoor, casting them together in the films Karma (1986), Ram Lakhan (1989) and Trimurti (1995), the latter which he had produced and it was directed by Mukul S. Anand. His 1993 release Khalnayak starring Sanjay Dutt, Madhuri Dixit and Shroff featured the hit songs "Nayak Nahin Khalnayak Hu Main" and the controversial "Choli Ke Peeche Kya Hai".

In 1997, he directed Pardes which starred Shahrukh Khan and newcomers Mahima Chaudhry and Apoorva Agnihotri. In 1999, he directed Taal which starred Aishwarya Rai, Akshaye Khanna and Anil Kapoor. Both Pardes and Taal were released internationally and were super-hits at the box office. His following films were Yaadein (2001) and Kisna (2005), which were box office flops.

He then took a break from directing and turned producer with films including Aitraaz (2004), Iqbal (2005), 36 China Town (2006) and Apna Sapna Money Money (2006). In 2006, he set up his own film institute Whistling Woods International in Mumbai. The institute trains students in filmmaking: production, direction, cinematography, acting, animation. Ghai has done brief cameos in his directorial ventures.

After a three-year hiatus from directing, he returned in 2008 with Black & White released on 7 March 2008 and, later Yuvvraaj released in November 2008 with collaboration Aaditya Kulshreshtha. which did not perform well at the box office. A. R. Rahman stated in an interview that Ghai had asked him to use the words "Jai Ho" in a song. Although intended for Yuvraaj, the song resulted in Jai Ho!, featured in Slumdog Millionaire and won the Academy Award for Best Original Song at the 81st Academy Awards.

At the Cannes International Film Festival in May 2018, Ghai announced that he is co-producing a biopic on Osho Rajneesh along with an Italian production house. The movie would be directed by Lakshen Sucameli.

Advisor 
Currently, he is also on the Board of Advisors of India's International Movement to Unite Nations (I.I.M.U.N.).

Awards

Filmography

Personal life
In 1970, Ghai married a woman from Pune named Rehana, later known as Mukta. Today, he lives in Mumbai with his wife, Mukta Ghai and daughters, Meghna Ghai Puri and Muskaan Ghai. Meghna Ghai Puri is the President of Whistling Woods International Institute.

Controversy 
In 2018, Subhash Ghai was accused of sexual assault by an anonymous woman. The victim, who used to be an assistant of Subash Ghai alleged that he raped her at Fariyas hotel, Lonavala after spiking her drinks with drugs. No Criminal case or FIR was registered in this matter while Ghai denied it strongly, calling it false.

References

External links

 Mukta Arts, Official website
 

Film directors from Mumbai
Film producers from Mumbai
Indian male screenwriters
Hindi-language film directors
Artists from Nagpur
Filmfare Awards winners
Film and Television Institute of India alumni
1945 births
Living people
20th-century Indian film directors
21st-century Indian film directors
Producers who won the Best Film on Other Social Issues National Film Award